is a Japanese badminton player from NTT East badminton club. In 2009, he won bronze at the Asia Junior Championships in the mixed team event. He also won bronze at the 2012 World University Championships in mixed doubles event partnered with Shiho Tanaka.

Achievements

BWF International Challenge/Series 
Men's doubles

  BWF International Challenge tournament
  BWF International Series tournament
  BWF Future Series tournament

References

External links 

Japanese male badminton players
Living people
1992 births
Sportspeople from Toyama Prefecture
21st-century Japanese people